Francesco Dell'Anno (born 4 June 1967) is an Italian former professional footballer who played as an attacking midfielder.

Playing career
A gifted playmaker, Dell'Anno began his career at Lazio and made his debut in the 1984–85 season, and his emergence was one of the few highlights of a dismal season for the Biancocelesti. He moved on to Arezzo and Taranto before joining Udinese in 1990.

Dell'Anno spent three seasons with Udinese, earning considerable praise for his displays in midfield during this time. A move to Internazionale followed, but he was unable to command a regular place before moving to Salernitana. His career enjoyed a renaissance after a move to Ravenna, before ending his career at Ternana.

Personal life
While playing for Lazio, Dell'Anno was engaged to the female Lazio footballer Eva Russo. The engagement broke off after four years.

References

1967 births
Living people
Sportspeople from the Province of Avellino
Italian footballers
Association football midfielders
Serie A players
Serie B players
Serie C players
S.S. Lazio players
Udinese Calcio players
S.S. Arezzo players
Taranto F.C. 1927 players
Inter Milan players
U.S. Salernitana 1919 players
Ravenna F.C. players
Ternana Calcio players
UEFA Cup winning players
Footballers from Campania